Qarah Aghaj-e Bala (also Romanized as Qarah Āghāj-e Bala; also known as Qarah Āghājlū-ye Bālā and Qareh Āghājlū-ye ‘Olyā) is a village in Angut-e Gharbi Rural District, Anguti District, Germi County, Ardabil Province, Iran. At the 2006 census, its population was 328, in 79 families.

References 

Towns and villages in Germi County